Treasure Cay, is a parcel of land connected to Great Abaco Island in the Bahamas. It has a population of 1,187 as of the 2010 Bahaman census.

There are two resorts Bahama Beach Club developed by Businessman Craig H. Roberts and Treasure Cay Beach Hotel, Marina & Golf resort, condos, villas, and private homes, many for rent. Located within are bars, restaurants, shops, and a bakery, a ceramic shop. There is a large marina that hosts seasonal fishing tournaments, tennis courts, and a golf course. Green Turtle Cay Ferry Dock is located on the island.

History
The settlement of Carleton Point, named after Sir Guy Carleton, was founded in 1783 on the northern end of Sand Banks Cay by about 600 Loyalists fleeing the post-Revolutionary United States. A hurricane hit in 1785, and the settlement was later deserted.

Transportation
The area is served by Treasure Cay Airport.

References

 Steve Dodge, The First Loyalist Settlements in Abaco, Carleton and Marsh's Harbour, 1979 (not seen)
 Sandy Estabrook's Abaco Guide
 Bahama Beach Club Treasure Cay Guide 

Populated places in the Bahamas
Abaco Islands